This is a list of Somerset first-class cricket records; that is, record team and individual performances in first-class cricket for Somerset County Cricket Club.

Team

Most runs in an innings

Fewest runs in an innings

Batting

Highest individual score

Most runs in a season

Most career runs
Qualification - 15000 runs

 Bold indicates a current Somerset player.

Most hundreds in a season

Most career hundreds
Qualification - 25 centuries

 Bold indicates a current Somerset player.

Highest score in each batting position

Highest partnership for each wicket

Bowling

Most wickets in an innings

Most wickets in a match

Most wickets in a season

Most career wickets
Qualification - 1000 wickets

Fielding

Most career catches
Qualification - 250 catches

 Bold indicates a current Somerset player.

Most wicket-keeping dismissals in a season

Most career wicket-keeping dismissals
Qualification - 200 dismissals

 Bold indicates a current Somerset player.

Other

Most career appearances
Qualification - 350 matches

See also
 List of Somerset List A cricket records
 List of Somerset Twenty20 cricket records

References

Somerset
Somerset County Cricket Club
Cricket